Tonya K. Bolden (born March 1, 1959) is an American writer best known for her works of children's literature, especially children's nonfiction.  

Bolden has authored, co-authored, collaborated on, or edited more than forty books. Hillary Rodham Clinton praised her 1998 book 33 Things Every Girl Should Know in a speech at Seneca Falls, N.Y. on the 150th anniversary of the first Women's Rights Convention. Maritcha: A Nineteenth-Century American Girl (2005), her children's biography of Maritcha Rémond Lyons, was the James Madison Book Award Winner and one of four honor books for the American Library Association’s Coretta Scott King Author Award.  M.L.K.: Journey of a King (2007) won the Orbis Pictus award from the National Council of Teachers of English, the organization’s highest award for children’s nonfiction, and the next year, her George Washington Carver (2008) was one of five honor books for the same award.  In 2016, the Children’s Book Guild of Washington, D.C. selected Bolden for its Nonfiction Award in recognition of her entire body of work, which, according to the award, has “contributed significantly to the quality of nonfiction for children.”.

Life and career

Early Years 
Tonya Bolden was born on March 1, 1959, in New York City to Willie J. and Georgia C. Bolden, who had moved to New York from North Carolina and South Carolina, respectively.  Georgia received formal education only through sixth grade, Willie through ninth.  However, both were firmly dedicated to providing as many educational opportunities as possible to Tonya and her sister Nelta.  Although her parents were careful with money, they were generous when it came to buying books, and Bolden specifically recalls that “whenever I came home with the list of books I wanted to buy at the Arrow Club book fair, they never, ever denied me.”

Although Bolden has claimed that her love of writing while in her parents’ home influenced her eventual choice of career, her parents’ habit of encouraging reading had as much to do with her personal joy as it did her eventual professional prospects.  Her parents, she recalls, “encouraged me to seek to earn a living doing something I absolutely loved. And when I was a child, I was crazy about reading and writing.”.  Indeed, Bolden has said that she has “been in love with books since I learned my ABCs” (Trussell).

Ironically, although Bolden is today best known for her historical fiction and nonfiction, as a child she was pointedly uninterested in history, especially in history learned through books.  “It was usually presented in such an uninteresting way,” she recalls. “I didn’t see myself or my people in history.”  Even when her uncle, whom she describes as “a history freak,” tried to introduce her to black history in Harlem, she often found herself thinking, “I don’t care.”  A rare exception was that she enjoyed the Little House on the Prairie television program, though today she suspects that she probably enjoyed it “for the props” or its “old-timey” aspects.

Education 
Bolden's early education was also marked by her parents’ firm investment in her growth.  Although her mother had no personal experience with quality education in New York, she did extensive research to learn where her daughter could get the best education (Maher 40).  Bolden attended M.E.S. 146, a public school in East Harlem, and later the Chapin School, a private school on Manhattan's Upper East Side. Bolden has credited excellent teaching at both of these schools with influencing her growth as a writer and desire to publish.

After graduating from Chapin, Bolden attended Princeton University, where, in 1981, she completed an undergraduate degree in Slavic Languages and Literature, with an emphasis on Russian.,

Following her graduation from Princeton, Bolden worked for two years before returning to school.  She then continued her studies at Columbia.  Bolden has suggested that, along with the multicultural setting of her childhood, her study of Russian in higher education deeply influenced her writing.  She completed her M.A. in 1985, again in Slavic Languages and Literatures with a concentration in Russian.

Early career 
Following her graduation, Bolden taught at both Malcolm-King College and the College of New Rochelle.  Her responsibilities included English courses, and she has mentioned that “the course I taught the most was TEE (Translating Experience into Essay). Many of my students were my age or older.  They were living proof that it’s never too late to learn.”

Although she intended to earn a doctorate and become a professor of Russian literature, it was while in graduate school that Bolden's work began appearing in print, at first mainly through freelance projects, notably in Black Enterprise magazine.  In 1987, Bolden began writing full-time, putting her in a position in which, as she later recalls, “I could not be picky.  I do not think I ever turned down any writing jobs no matter how small or seemingly insignificant.”

Bolden's first major book project, a young adult novel adaptation of Vy Higginsen’s musical Mama, I Want to Sing, was published in 1992 by Scholastic.  Bolden has argued that this opportunity came about in part because of the work she had put in on smaller pieces and in part good fortune.  She says, “Marie Brown, my agent at the time, pitched me to Vy Higginsen and to Scholastic,” and the experience went so well that “the editor talked about my doing another book for her.”  Thus, she remembers, “writing for the young found me and I found myself loving it more and more.”

Themes 
Central to the overwhelming majority of Bolden's writing is an awareness of identity and the role that books can play in the formation and revision of identity.  In a 2014 essay entitled “All the Children Need All the Books,” Bolden borrows a set of terms from Rudine Sims Bishop to argue that We, who truly care about the future of this nation, we who truly want our youngsters to be their best selves, we absolutely must become more involved in the campaign for all children to have mirrors—books in which they see themselves—and for all children to have windows—books through which they learn about people who do not look like them, speak as they do, or worship as they do—people who do not share their cultural norms.Children's books in general are important to this process, she argues, but she has stated elsewhere that nonfiction, especially historical nonfiction, is especially key to such a project.  “What I came to understand as an adult,” she explains, “is that there is power in the past. Knowing history can be a powerful antidote to shame/self-hatred/identity-confusion.”

A subset of the theme of the importance of identity in her work is a specifically black experience of history. She explains:I write because I am the beneficiary of the prayers, hopes, and labors of generations, of people I never knew who braved water cannons, police dogs, burning crosses on lawns, so that I might have wider opportunities.  How can I not contribute?            I write because my parents, born poor and into the world of Jim Crow, seeded in me a love of reading and for school and for learning and for striving for excellence. And indeed, as Bolden explains elsewhere, The fact that all but one of my young adult books are black-themed is not coincidental.  Yes, all young adults can benefit from books about black history and culture; however, it is imperative that black youth read stories and histories about Africa and the African diaspora.  I’ll never forget what a psychologist told me years ago:  At about the age of four or five most African American children begin to wonder why the world does not like them.  One way, and my main way to prevent this wondering from festering into self-loathing is to create books that definitively speak to black youth, books that teach them, that celebrate their history, their  existence, their potential.  Of course, I am far from alone on this mission. Although not nearly as widespread in her work, Christianity is also a common theme, especially within the context of Black American experiences.  In an interview with BlackandChristian.com, Bolden notes that The Black Church has influenced me in a number of ways. In terms of history, it helped my people survive and build-up.  In terms of my writing, the music of the Black Church (from the spirituals to gospel) and the tones and rhythms of classic black preaching have become part of my “vocabulary.” It's hard to articulate and even pinpoint, but I know that my style of writing has been influenced by the culture of the Black Church.That sensibility manifests in many of her books, and Bolden has identified two books in particular in which readers can and, Bolden feels, should see the influence of Christianity. When discussing her 2001 book Rock of Ages:  A Tribute to the Black Church, Bolden argued that “People shouldn't have to wait until they are 20 or 30 to learn about the significance of the Black Church.”  Elsewhere, she has confided that she “took a risk” in the way that she wrote her 2006 book M.L.K.: Journey of a King by emphasizing the role of the “supernatural” in King's life:  “many people prefer a King who is not so much of a Christian,” she explains.

Papers 
One box of Bolden's papers (consisting of production materials for three of her books) has been donated to the Kerlan Collection at the University of Minnesota Libraries.

Books 
 The Family Heirloom Cookbook (Putnam, 1990)
 Mama, I Want to Sing (Scholastic, 1992)  (Co-author with Vy Higginsen)
 Starting a Business from Your Home (Longmeadow, 1993)
 Conversations: Straight Talk with America's Sister President (Doubleday, 1993) (Collaborator for Johnnetta B. Cole)
 Activity Booklet for Sweet Honey In The Rock recording I Got Shoes (Music For Little People, 1994) (Co-author with Bernice Johnson Reagon)
 Educator’s Guide for Wade in the Water: African American Sacred Music Traditions (26-part broadcast; NPR, 1994) (Co-author with Bernice Johnson Reagon, et al.)
 Mail-Order and Direct Response (Longmeadow, 1994)
 Rites of Passage: Stories About Growing Up by Black Writers From Around the World (Hyperion, 1994) (editor)
 The Book of African-American Women: 150 Crusaders, Creators, and Uplifters (Adams, 1996)
 Just Family (novel; Cobblehill, 1996)
 Through Loona's Door: A Tammy and Owen Adventure with Carter G. Woodson (Corporation for Cultural Literacy, 1997)
 And Not Afraid to Dare: The Stories of Ten African-American Women (Scholastic, 1998)
 33 Things Every Girl Should Know: Stories, Songs, Poems, and Smart Talk by 33 Extraordinary Women (Crown, 1998) (editor)
 Strong Men Keep Coming: The Book of African-American Men (Wiley, 1999)
 Forgive or Forget: Never Underestimate the Power of Forgiveness (HarperCollins, 1999) (Co-author with Mother Love)
 Rejuvenate! (It’s Never Too Late) (Scribner/A Lisa Drew Book, 2001) (Co-author with Eartha Kitt)
 Rock of Ages: A Tribute to the Black Church (Knopf, 2001; Dell Dragonfly, 2003)
 Tell All the Children Our Story: Memories & Mementos of Being Young and Black in America (Abrams Books, 2001)
 33 Things Every Girl Should Know About Women’s History (Crown, 2002) (editor)
 American Patriots: The Story of Blacks in the Military from the Revolution to Desert Storm (Crown, 2003) (Co-author with Gail Buckley: young readers’ edition)
 Chaka! Through the Fire (Rodale, 2003)  (Co-author with Chaka Khan)
 Portraits of African-American Heroes (Dutton, 2003; Puffin Books, 2005)
 Wake Up Our Souls: A Celebration of Black American Artists (Abrams, 2004)
 The Champ: The Story of Muhammad Ali (Knopf, 2004; Dragonfly Books, 2007) 
 Maritcha: A Nineteenth Century American Girl (Abrams, 2005)
 Cause: Reconstruction America, 1863-1877 (Knopf, 2005)
 Weddings Valentine Style (Atria, 2006) (Co-author with Diann Valentine)
 Half the Mother, Twice the Love: My Journey to Better Health with Diabetes (Atria, 2006) (Co-author with Mother Love)
 MLK: Journey of a King (Abrams, 2006)
 Take-Off: America All-Girl Bands During WWII (Knopf, 2007)
 George Washington Carver (Abrams, 2008)
 Say A Little Prayer (Running Press, 2008) (Co-author with Dionne Warwick and David Freeman Wooley)
 W. E. B. Du Bois: A Twentieth-Century Life (Viking, 2008)
 FDR’s Alphabet Soup: New Deal America, 1932-1939 (Knopf, 2010)
 Finding Family (Bloomsbury, 2010)
 Emancipation Proclamation: Lincoln and the Dawn of Liberty (Abrams, 2013) 
 12 Days of New York (Abrams, 2013)
 Searching for Sarah Rector: The Richest Black Girl in America (Abrams, 2014)
 Beautiful Moon: A Child’s Prayer (Abrams, 2014)
 Capital Days: Michael Shiner’s Journal and the Growth of Our Nation’s Capital (Abrams, 2015)
 This Kid Can Fly (Balzer + Bray, 2016) (Co-author with Aaron Philip)
 How to Build a Museum: Smithsonian’s National Museum of African American History and Culture (Viking, 2016)
 Pathfinders: The Journeys of 16 Extraordinary Black Souls (Abrams, 2017)
 Crossing Ebenezer Creek (Bloomsbury, 2017)
 Facing Frederick: The Life of Frederick Douglass, a Monumental American Man (Abrams, 2017)
 Inventing Victoria (Bloomsbury, 2019)

Awards and honors 
In 2016, Bolden received the Nonfiction Award for Body of Work from the Children's Book Guild of Washington, DC.

Awards for individual books:

Mama, I Want to Sing
  New York Public Library Book for the Teen Age
Just Family
 Junior Library Guild Selection
And Not Afraid to Dare: The Stories of Ten African-American Women
 New York Public Library Book for the Teen Age
 Excerpted in the March–April 1999 Crisis
33 Things Every Girl Should Know: Stories, Songs, Poems, and Smart Talk by 33 Extraordinary Women
 ALA Best Book for Young Adults
Strong Men Keep Coming: The Book of African-American Men
 Black Expressions Book Club Selection
 New York Public Library Book for the Teen Age
Rock of Ages: A Tribute to the Black Church
 National Parenting Product Awards (NAPPA) Honors Award
Tell All the Children Our Story: Memories & Mementos of Being Young and Black in America
 2002 School Library Journal Best Book of the Year
 2002 ALA Best Book for Young Adults Nominee
 Scholastic TAB Book Club Selection (a Top Pick, January 2003)
 Black Expressions Book Club Selection
Portraits of African-American Heroes
 NCSS-CBC Notable Children's Trade Book in the Field of Social Studies
Wake Up Our Souls: A Celebration of Black American Artists
 YALSA Best Book for Young Adults
 VOYA Nonfiction Honor List
The Champ: The Story of Muhammad Ali
 Louisiana Young Readers’ Choice Award Selection
 Booklist Top 10 Youth Sports Book
Maritcha: A Nineteenth Century American Girl
 James Madison Book Award Winner
 Coretta Scott King Author Honor Book
 YALSA Best Book for Young Adults
 ALSC 2006 Notable Children's Book
 NAPPA Gold Award Winner
 CCBC Best Book of the Year
 New York Public Library Book for the Teen Age
Cause: Reconstruction America, 1863-1877
 New York Public Library Book for the Teen Age
M.L.K.: Journey of a King
 2008 NCTE Orbis Pictus Award for Outstanding Nonfiction for Children
Take-Off: America All-Girl Bands During WWII
 New York Public Library Book for the Teen Age
George Washington Carver
 New York Public Library Book for the Teen Age
 A finalist for the 2009 AAAS/Subaru SB&F Prize for Excellence in Science Books
 NAPPA Gold Award
 NYPL's Children's Books: 100 Titles for Reading and Sharing
 Booklist pick for its 2008 “Top 10 Sci-Tech Books for Youth”
 Orbis Pictus Honor Book
 International Reading Association Notable Book for a Global Society
 Booklist Top 10 Black History Book
 Jefferson Cup winner (Virginia Library Association)
 Cleveland Public Library Sugarman Award
FDR's Alphabet Soup: New Deal America, 1932-1939
 Chicago Public Library “Best of the Best for 2010”
 IRA-CBC Teachers’ Choices Reading List Pick
Finding Family
 Kirkus Reviews Best Children's Books
Emancipation Proclamation: Lincoln and the Dawn of Liberty
 Bulletin Blue Ribbon Book
 Orbis Pictus Award Recommended Book
 ALSC Notable Children's Book
 NCSS Notable Social Studies Trade Book for Young People
 CCBC Choices 2014
 Best Book of the Year, Children's Book Committee, Bank Street College of Education
 NCSS Carter G. Woodson Book Award
Searching for Sarah Rector: The Richest Black Girl in America
 NAACP Image Award Nominee
 Best Multicultural Children's Book, Center for the Study of Multicultural Children's Literature
 California Reading Association Eureka! Honor Book
 Wisconsin Reading Association Recommended Book
 NCSS Carter G. Woodson Honor Award
Beautiful Moon: A Child's Prayer
 NAACP Image Award Nominee
 Charlotte Zolotow Award Honor Book
 ALSC Notable Children's Book

References

External links 
 Official Website
 Bolden’s Papers in the Kerlan Collection

African-American children's writers
American non-fiction children's writers
Historians of African Americans
Carter G. Woodson Book Award winners
Chapin School (Manhattan) alumni
Columbia University alumni
Princeton University alumni
Writers from Manhattan
Living people
1959 births
21st-century African-American people
20th-century African-American people